Ann was a slave ship that sailed from Liverpool in 1807 in the triangular trade in enslaved persons. As of December 2022, her origins are obscure. Ann, William Brown, master sailed from England on 4 May 1807.

She arrived at Sierra Leone from Liverpool and by September was at "Kiltann" (or "Kittanu"). In mid-December she was on the Windward Coast when she exploded with the loss of some 100 captives and some crew. Apparently she had caught fire. Some crew survived. 

Minerva acquired about 100 surviving captives and took them to Barbados. 

Ann does not appear in the most complete record of losses among enslaving ships, or captains of enslaving ships.

Notes

Citations

References
 
 

1800s ships
Liverpool slave ships
Maritime incidents in 1807
Ship fires
Maritime incidents involving slave ships